Dreams are successions of images, ideas, emotions, and sensations that usually occur involuntarily in the mind during certain stages of sleep.

Dreams or The Dreams may also refer to:

Books
 Dreams (Ivan Bunin), a 1904 novella

Business and brands
 Dreams (bed retailer), based in the UK

Film and TV

Films
 Dreams (1955 film), a Swedish drama film directed by Ingmar Bergman
 Dreams (1990 film), a Japanese magical realism film directed by Akira Kurosawa
 Dreams (1993 film), a 1993 Russian absurdist comedy
 Dreams (2000 film), an Indian Malayalam-language film
 Dreams (2004 film), an Indian Tamil-language romance
 Dreams (2005 film), an India Hindi film
 Dreams (2006 film), an Iraqi film
 Dreams (2016 film), a Nepali film
 Dreams (2016), an Indonesian film with music by Elwin Hendrijanto

Television
 Dreams (TV series), an American sitcom
 "Dreams" (M*A*S*H), a 1980 episode from the television series M*A*S*H

Gaming
 Dreams, the PlayStation port of PC game Dreams to Reality
 Dreams (video game), a game developed by Media Molecule for PlayStation 4

Music

Artists
 The Dreams, a Faroese punk rock group
 Dreams (band), an American jazz rock group

Albums
 Dreams, by 2 Brothers on the 4th Floor, 1994
 Dreams, by Susan Jacks, 1975
 Dreams, by Toad, 1975
 Dreams (The Allman Brothers Band album), 1989
 Dreams (EP), by We Came as Romans, 2008
 Dreams (Evermore album), 2004
 Dreams (Fra Lippo Lippi album), 1992
 Dreams (Gábor Szabó album), 1968
 Dreams (Grace Slick album), 1980
 Dreams (Klaus Schulze album), 1986
 Dreams (Miz album), 2005
 Dreams (Neil Diamond album), 2010
 Dreams (Philip Bailey album), 1999
 Dreams (The Whitest Boy Alive album), 2006
 Dreams (With Pollutions When Virile), a 2001 album by Oneiroid Psychosis
 Dreams: The Ultimate Corrs Collection, a 2006 album by The Corrs

Songs
 "Dreams", by All Saints from the album Saints & Sinners
 "Dreams", by The Allman Brothers Band from the album The Allman Brothers Band
 "Dreams", by Ashanti from the self-titled album
 "Dreams", by Bazzi from the album Cosmic
 "Dreams", by Brandi Carlile from the album Give Up The Ghost
 "Dreams", by Dua Lipa from the album Dua Lipa
 "Dreams", by Enya from the British motion picture The Frog Prince
 "Dreams", by John Legend from the album Love in the Future
 "Dreams", by King's X from the album Black Like Sunday
 "Dreams", by Kings of Tomorrow
 "Dreams", by The Kinks from Percy
 "Dreams", by The Kooks from the album Listen
 "Dreams", by Kylie Minogue from the album Impossible Princess
 "Dreams", by Lil Wayne from the album Funeral
 "Dreams", by The Soft Boys from the album Underwater Moonlight
 "Dreams", by Taproot from the album Welcome
 "Dreams", by Taylor Dayne from the album Naked Without You
 "Dreams", by TV on the Radio from the album Desperate Youth, Blood Thirsty Babes
 "Dreams", by Uriah Heep from the album Wonderworld
 "Dreams", by Lynsey de Paul from the album Love Bomb 
 "Dreams" (Beck song), 2015
 "Dreams" (The Cranberries song), 1992
 "Dreams" (Diana DeGarmo song), 2004
 "Dreams" (Fleetwood Mac song), 1977, covered by Wild Colour,  and The Corrs
 "Dreams", by Deep Dish from the album George Is On (cover)
 "Dreams" (Gabrielle song), 1993
 "Dreams" (The Game song), 2005
 "Dreams" (High and Mighty Color song), 2007
 "Dreams" (Smokin Beats song), 1997
 "Dreams" (Van Halen song), 1986
 "Dreams" (Will Come Alive), a 1994 song by 2 Brothers on the 4th Floor
 "Träume" ("Dreams" in German), by Richard Wagner from the composition Wesendonck Lieder

See also